Division No. 3 is a census division in Alberta, Canada. It is located in the southwest corner of southern Alberta and its largest urban community is the Town of Claresholm.

Census subdivisions 
The following census subdivisions (municipalities or municipal equivalents) are located within Alberta's Division No. 3.

Towns
Cardston
Claresholm
Fort Macleod
Granum
Magrath
Nanton
Pincher Creek
Stavely
Villages
Cowley
Glenwood
Hill Spring
Municipal districts
Cardston County
Pincher Creek No. 9, M.D. of
Willow Creek No. 26, M.D. of
Improvement districts
Improvement District No. 4 (Waterton Lakes National Park)
Indian reserves
Blood 148
Blood 148A
Piikani 147

Demographics 

See also 
List of census divisions of Alberta
List of communities in Alberta

References 

D03